Sing Me a Lullaby is a Canadian short documentary film, directed by Tiffany Hsiung and released in 2020. The film documents Hsiung's efforts to locate and reconnect with her mother's birth family in Taiwan, following her mother's separation from her parents and adoption in childhood.

The film premiered at the 2020 Toronto International Film Festival, where it was named winner of the Share Her Journey award. The film was subsequently also announced as a nominee for Best Short Film at the 2020 Directors Guild of Canada awards.

The film was named to TIFF's year-end Canada's Top Ten list for short films. The film won the Canadian Screen Award for Best Short Documentary at the 9th Canadian Screen Awards in 2021.

References

External links

2020 films
2020 short documentary films
Canadian short documentary films
Films about Asian Canadians
Best Short Documentary Film Genie and Canadian Screen Award winners
2020s English-language films
2020s Canadian films